Totalmente Inocentes is a 2012 Brazilian comedy film directed and written by Rodrigo Bittencourt. The film is a parody of the "favela movies", a genre whose exponents films are City of God and Elite Squad.

The film stars Fábio Porchat, Fabio Assunção, Mariana Rios, Kiko Mascarenhas, Fábio Lago, Leandro Firmino and Álamo Facó, in addition to the special guests Ingrid Guimarães, Felipe Neto, Vivianne Pasmanter and Di Ferrero, lead singer of the band NX Zero.

The film received generally negative reviews from critics, and grossed a total of $2,659,775 in Brazil.

Plot
The community of the DDC is at war. The Branquelo do Morro and the Diaba Loira shemale are vying for power in the community. Oblivious to this, Da Fé believes he needs to become the boss of the hill to conquer the love of Gildinha. Everything gets worse when the reporter Vanderlei forges a cover.

Cast

Reception

Critical response
Totalmente Inocentes received more negative reviews than positive, in several websites; one of the main Brazilian websites about movies, the AdoroCinema.com ranked the film with 1.5. The critic website wrote that "Totalmente Inocentes is a tiring film, it doesn't explores convincingly the material at hand [...] a movie totally weak." Critics from other well-known websites, like CineClick said "Totalmente Inocentes has a poor script and direction shortsighted and does not comply with the basic commitment of a comedy: make people laugh". The website Cinema com Rapadura, quoted that "The humor is ridiculous and so unfunny". Criticism from viewers of the websites were not different, mostly criticizing the script of Rodrigo Bittencourt.

References

External links 
 

2010s parody films
Films shot in Paulínia
Films shot in Rio de Janeiro (city)
Brazilian parody films
2012 comedy films
2012 films
Works about organized crime in Brazil
2010s Portuguese-language films